Bigbee is an unincorporated community in Monroe County, Mississippi.

According to the United States Geological Survey, a variant name is Johnsons Mill.

Bigbee derives its name from shortening and alteration of the nearby East Fork Tombigbee River.

References

Unincorporated communities in Monroe County, Mississippi
Unincorporated communities in Mississippi
Mississippi placenames of Native American origin